Katherine Davis may refer to:

Katherine Kennicott Davis (1892–1980), American composer, pianist, and author of "The Little Drummer Boy"
Kathy Davis (born 1956), 46th Lieutenant Governor of Indiana
Katharine Bement Davis (1860–1935), American progressive era social reformer and criminologist
Kate Davis (born 1991), actress and musician
Kate Davis (director), American director
Catherine Davis (1924–2002), American poet

See also
Kathryn Davis (disambiguation)
Katie Davis (disambiguation)
Catherine Davies (disambiguation)